Let It Come Down may refer to:
Let It Come Down (novel), a 1952 novel by Paul Bowles
Let It Come Down (Spiritualized album)
Let It Come Down (James Iha album)

See also
"Let it come down" is a line from Shakespeare's play Macbeth, Act III, Scene 3